This is a listing of the horses that finished in either first, second, or third place and the number of starters in the Arkansas Derby, an American Grade I race for three-year-olds at 1-1/8 miles on dirt held at Oaklawn Park in Hot Springs, Arkansas.

References 

Oaklawn Park
Lists of horse racing results